Jacque Peak is a high and prominent mountain summit in the Gore Range of the Rocky Mountains of North America.

Mountain

See also

List of mountain peaks of North America
List of mountain peaks of the United States
List of mountain peaks of Colorado

References

External links

Mountains of Colorado
Mountains of Summit County, Colorado
White River National Forest
North American 4000 m summits